Jacob Martin Portrait is an American multi-instrumentalist, songwriter, and record producer. He is the bassist of the New Zealand psychedelic rock band Unknown Mortal Orchestra, and a current member of the Portland-based alternative rock band Blouse.

Career
Portrait is from Portland, Oregon.

Portrait started the psychedelic rock band Unknown Mortal Orchestra in 2010 along with Ruban Nielson, and is currently playing with the band as their bassist. He has worked with the band on their albums Multi-Love (2015), Sex & Food (2018), and IC-01 Hanoi (2018).

Portrait teamed up with singer-guitarist Charlie Hilton and bassist Patrick Adams to form the alternative rock band Blouse in Portland. The band's self-titled first album was released in 2011, and the band's second album Imperium was released in 2013.

Portrait has produced music for several artists. In 2016 he produced the album Palana by Charlie Hilton of Blouse. Porches' album Ricky Music was co-produced by Portrait. He co-produced and recorded Someone New by Helena Deland. He also collaborated with Okay Kaya on her album Watch This Liquid Pour Itself.

Portrait has worked with Alex G as a mixing engineer on his albums Beach Music (2015), Rocket (2017), House of Sugar (2019), and God Save the Animals (2022). God Save the Animals was co-produced by Portrait with Alex G. He also worked as an audio engineer on Whitney's Forever Turned Around in 2019.

In 2020, Portrait co-wrote the lyrics of "I'd Die for You" on Paloma Faith's Infinite Things alongside Faith and Patrick Wimberly. In 2021, he worked as a producer and writer on Cloves' Nightmare on Elmfield Road. Several tracks on Claud's debut album Super Monster were composed and produced by Portrait.

Awards
 2015 - APRA Silver Scroll Awards - Nominated (Song: "Can't Keep Checking My Phone" - Songwriter)
 2018 - APRA Silver Scroll Awards - Nominated (Song: "Hunnybee" - Songwriter)

References

External links
 

Living people

Year of birth missing (living people)
Musicians from Portland, Oregon
Psychedelic rock musicians
American alternative rock musicians
Singer-songwriters from Oregon
Record producers from Oregon